The Federation of Socialist Parties from Romania (FPSR) was a political alliance in Romania.

History
In the 1922 elections it won a single seat in the Chamber of Deputies. However, it did not contest any further elections. In 1927 it was succeeded by the Romanian Social Democratic Party.

Electoral history

Legislative elections

References

1927 disestablishments in Romania
Defunct political party alliances in Romania
Defunct socialist parties in Romania
Political parties disestablished in 1927
Political parties established in 1921